Fuentes de Valdepero is a municipality located in the province of Palencia, Castile and León, Spain.

It has a population of 429.

References

Municipalities in the Province of Palencia